Bang Bang Boom Cake is the debut album by punk rock band Tiny Masters of Today.

Track list
"K.I.D.S."
"Stickin' It to the Man"
"Hey, Mr. DJ"
"Disco Bomb"
"Hologram World"
"Pictures"
"Radio Riot"
"Trendsetter"
"Book Song"
"Texas"
"Bushy"
"End of My Rope"
"Tooty Frooty (Clarke's Dream Song)"

Personnel
Ivan: vocals, guitar
Ada: vocals, bass guitar, keyboards, percussion
Russell Simins: drums

Additional personnel
Karen O: vocals on "Hologram World"
Nick Zinner: guitar on "Hologram World"
Fred Schneider: vocals on "Disco Bomb"
Kimya Dawson: vocals on "Trendsetter", Backing Vocals On "Book Song"
Angelo Spencer: lead guitar on "Trendsetter"
DJ Atsushi Numata: sound effects on "Hey, Mr. DJ"
Gibby Haynes: vocals on "Texas"

References

Tiny Masters of Today albums
2007 debut albums
Mute Records albums